Venezuela competed at the 2013 World Games held in Cali, Colombia.

Medalists

Karate 

Two medals were won in karate. Antonio Díaz won the gold medal in the men's kata event and Ángel Aponte won the silver medal in the men's kumite +84 kg event.

References 

Nations at the 2013 World Games
2013 in Venezuelan sport
2013